Ian Kerner is a sex counselor and practitioner of psychotherapy.  He specializes in sex therapy, couples therapy, and working with individuals on a range of relationship issues.

Career

Ian is a licensed psychotherapist and a widely recognized sexuality counselor who specializes in sex therapy, couples therapy, and working with individuals on a range of relational issues that often lead to distress. He approaches psychotherapy from an integrative perspective, which seeks to explain human behavior by bringing together physiological, affective, cognitive-behavioral, neurobiological, and systemic approaches as they apply to the natural stages of human development and the wide range of human functioning. He endeavors to create an atmosphere of inquisitive reflection while fostering a sense of safety and commitment to the therapist-patient bond.

In addition to being a Clinical Fellow of the American Association of Marriage and Family Therapists (AAMFT), Ian is certified by the American Association of Sexuality Educators, Counselors and Therapists, and has sat on AASECT's board of directors. He is also a member of the Society for Sex Therapy and Research (SSTAR) and The American Family Therapy Academy (AFTA). His practice is composed equally of heterosexual and LGBTQ patients and is split between individuals and couples.

Ian has received post-graduate certification from the Psychotherapy Center for Gender and Sexuality and the Family and Couples Treatment Services divisions at ICP, where he is also on the faculty and teaches courses in sex therapy. Ian has also completed a post-graduate program in Trauma Studies at ICP, where he was trained in EMDR (Eye Movement Desensitization and Reprocessing) in addition to other modalities for working with trauma survivors.

Ian was born and raised in New York City, where he lives with his wife and two sons and their family dogs, Jitterbug and Oscar.

Books and articles
Kerner is the author of She Comes First: the Thinking Man's Guide to Pleasuring a Woman. New York Times contributor Amy Sohn called the book "the Encyclopedia Britannica of the clitoris."  Sohn went on to say that "...with a cool sense of humor and an obsessive desire to inform, he encourages men through an act that many find mystifying."  She Comes First was selected by both Amazon.com and Borders as a "Best of 2004" non-fiction title and has been translated into numerous languages.  The companion book He Comes Next: the Thinking Woman's Guide to Pleasuring a Man was published in 2005.  Kerner also wrote Be Honest, You're Not That Into Him Either.

Public speaking
Ian is regularly quoted as an expert in various media, with recent features in The Atlantic, The New York Times, The Economist, and NPR, amongst others. Ian contributes regularly on the topic of sex for CNN Health. He lectures frequently on topics related to sex and relationships, with recent appearances at New York University, Yale, Princeton, the Ackerman Institute, and the Psychotherapy Networker Symposium.

References

Year of birth missing (living people)
Living people
American male non-fiction writers
Watson Fellows
Brandeis University alumni
New York University alumni
American sexologists
American non-fiction writers